Dunk Mania is an arcade video game developed and published by Namco in 1996.

Gameplay
Dunk Mania is a basketball game that features motion-capture in a two-on-two slam-dunk contest.

Reception

Dunk Mania was only a moderate success in Japan. Next Generation stated that "in following the herd, one does begin to wonder whether it's a flashy first effort with deeper games to come, or if it's just a great-looking, cookie cutter basketball coin-op with no real sense of the sport itself underneath all the glitz."

Reviews
Edge

References

1996 video games
Arcade video games
Arcade-only video games
Basketball video games
Namco arcade games
Video games developed in Japan
Video games scored by Nobuyoshi Sano